Papitwo is an album released by Spanish pop singer Miguel Bosé after the success of his first duet album, Papito. The album includes 14 tracks of previously known hit songs by the artist, in reworked versions in collaboration with many artists including Juanes, Alejandro Sanz, Pablo Alborán, Ximena Sariñana and other great Latin artists.

Singles

 "Linda" was released as the album's lead single on 3 September 2012.

Track listing 

Album CD

 Linda (feat. Malú)
 Aire Soy (feat. Ximena Sariñana)
 Creo en Ti (feat. Juan Luis Guerra)
 Decirnos Adiós (feat. Penélope Cruz)
 Con las Ganas de Decirte (feat. Helen de Quiroga)
 Partisano (feat. Juanes)
 Puede Que (feat. Pablo Alborán)
 Mirarte (feat. Jovanotti)
 Sol Forastero (feat. Joaquin Sabina)
 Te Digo Amor (feat. Dani Martin)
 Amiga (feat. Tiziano Ferro)
 Shoot Me In the Back (feat. Bimba Bosé)
 Duende (feat. Aleks Syntek)
 Te Comería el Corazón (feat. Alejandro Sanz)

Bonus CD (only on Deluxe Edition)

 Sea lo que sea será (feat. Above & Beyond)
 Wrong in the right way (feat. Spankox)
 Switch (feat. Frank Quintero)
 Amor del bueno (feat. Reyli)
 Lo noto (feat. Hombres G)
 De mi lado (feat. Ana Torroja)
 Iruten ari nuzu (feat. Kepa Junkera)
 Encontrarás (feat. Natasha St. Pier)
 Si no pueden quererte (feat. Natalia Lafourcade)
 Dance! dance! dance! (feat. Marlango)
 Espinita (feat. Albert Hammond)
 Morir de amor (feat. Raphael)
 Tres palabras (feat. Tania Libertad)
 Tómbola (feat. Ana Belén)

Studio Personnel 
Recorded By: Pepo Scherman

Mixed By: Andy Bradfield

Mastered By: Antonio Baglio

Charts

Weekly charts

Year-end charts

Certifications

References

2012 albums
Miguel Bosé albums
Warner Music Spain albums
Vocal duet albums